The Little Red School is a former school building located in Kingman, Arizona, that was listed on the National Register of Historic Places on May 14, 1986.

The Little Red School is located at 219 Fourth Street in Kingman, Arizona. The building was constructed in 1896 in the Queen Anne style, with the firm Hartley, Cooper & Hines recorded as the architects or builders or both. It replaced an earlier school building, Kingman's first, and remained in use until 1928. Actor Andy Devine was an alumnus of the school.

After the closure of the school the building hosted the activities of several local groups. Kingman's Catholic community met there until the construction of St. Mary's church, and the Christian Science Church and the Elks Lodge used the building at various periods. During World War II the Ration Board operated out of the schoolhouse. After the war Kingman's Chamber of Commerce briefly used the building as their office, sharing it with the Public Library. After the library outgrew the premises the building came under the ownership of the City of Kingman; it is today the city's Magistrate's Office.

The building was mentioned in a survey of historic properties in Kingman.

See also

 National Register of Historic Places listings in Mohave County, Arizona

References

Schoolhouses in Arizona
Queen Anne architecture in Arizona
School buildings completed in 1896
1896 establishments in Arizona Territory
Former school buildings in the United States
Buildings and structures in Kingman, Arizona
School buildings on the National Register of Historic Places in Arizona
Defunct schools in Arizona
One-room schoolhouses in Arizona
National Register of Historic Places in Kingman, Arizona